Events in 2007 in animation. 



Events

January
 January 4: American activist and animator Helen Hill is murdered by an unidentified intruder in her home.
 January 8: Qubo launches as a 24/7 channel.
 January 31: The Boston bomb scare occurs and the U.S. Coast Guard and Boston Police shut down parts of Interstate 93, two bridges, and a section of the Charles River after the discovery of suspicious devices placed around the city. However, said devices turned out to be not bombs but rather marketing tools for Aqua Teen Hunger Force Colon Movie Film for Theaters.

February
 February 23: After 8 years, Cartoon Network officially ends the Fridays block.
 February 25: 79th Academy Awards: 
 Happy Feet by George Miller wins the Academy Award for Best Animated Feature.
 The Danish Poet by Torill Kove wins the Academy Award for Best Animated Short Film.

March
 March 5: The first episode of Shaun the Sheep airs.
 March 15: Alan Becker releases "Animator vs Animation II" on Newgrounds
 March 23: The film Meet the Robinsons, co-produced by Walt Disney Company, is released.
 March 25: The Simpsons episode "Homerazzi" premieres, in which the opening sequence feature Homer going through evolution, one of the longest opening scenes in the history of the show.

May
 May 6: Shrek the Third is released by DreamWorks.
 May 20: The Simpsons 400th episode "You Kent Always Say What You Want" is broadcast, which satirizes FOX News.
 May 23: Vincent Paronnaud's Persepolis, based on Marjane Satrapi's eponymous graphic novel, is first released.

June
 June 8: Ash Brannon and Chris Buck's Surf's Up is first released.
 June 22: Ratatouille, produced by Pixar and the Walt Disney Company, is first released.

July
 July 21: The Simpsons Movie is first released.

August
 August 13: American-Canadian animator Paul Boyd was shot and killed after wielding a bicycle chain at officers who came to respond to a disturbance involving him.
 August 17: The first episode of Phineas and Ferb airs.

October
 October 18: The Three Robbers, based on a children's book by Tomi Ungerer, is released by Hayo Freitag.
 October 20: The live-action film with animated sequences Enchanted premiers.
 October 21: The horror anthology film Fear(s) of the Dark is first released, featured animated sequences by several well-known comics artists.

November
 November 2: Bee Movie by Simon J. Smith and Steve Hickner is first released.
 November 12: The first SpongeBob SquarePants television film, Atlantis SquarePantis, first airs, attracting 8.8 million viewers.
 November 27: The film Futurama: Bender's Big Score is released.

December
 December 4: Animation studio Studio B Productions was acquired by DHX Media.
 December 27: Three Little Pigs is added to the National Film Registry.

Awards
 Academy Award for Best Animated Feature: Ratatouille
 Animation Kobe Feature Film Award: Paprika
 Annie Award for Best Animated Feature: Ratatouille
 Asia Pacific Screen Award for Best Animated Feature Film: 5 Centimeters Per Second
 BAFTA Award for Best Animated Film: Ratatouille
 César Award for Best Foreign Film: Waltz with Bashir
 Goya Award for Best Animated Film: Nocturna
 Japan Academy Prize for Animation of the Year: Tekkonkinkreet
 Japan Media Arts Festival Animation Grand Prize: Summer Days with Coo
 Mainichi Film Awards - Animation Grand Award: Summer Days with Coo

Films released

 January 9 - Mosaic (United States)
 January 14 - Flatland the Film (United States)
 January 18 - Chicago 10 (United States)
 January 19:
 From the Sea (Spain)
 Land of the Child (Lebanon)
 We Are the Strange (United States)
 January 23 - The Invincible Iron Man (United States)
 January 25: 
 One Night in One City (Czech Republic)
 Yobi, the Five Tailed Fox (South Korea)
 January 31 - Snow White: The Sequel (United Kingdom, Belgium, and France)
 February 2 - Branimals (Brazil)
 February 6:
 Cinderella III: A Twist in Time (United States)
 A Very Pony Place (United States)
 February 16 - Monica's Gang in an Adventure in Time (Brazil)
 February 17 - JoJo's Bizarre Adventure: Phantom Blood (Japan)
 February 23:
 Elias and the Royal Yacht (Norway)
 Mobile Suit Gundam SEED Destiny: Special Edition IV - The Cost of Freedom (Japan)
 February 27 - Bratz Fashion Pixiez (United States)
 March 2 - Film Noir (United States and Serbia)
 March 3: 
 5 Centimeters Per Second (Japan)
 One Piece Movie: The Desert Princess and the Pirates: Adventures in Alabasta (Japan)
 Strawberry Shortcake: Berry Blossom Festival (United States)
 March 10:
 Doraemon: Nobita's New Great Adventure into the Underworld – The Seven Magic Users (Japan)
 Hellboy: Blood and Iron (United States)
 March 13 - Barbie Fairytopia: Magic of the Rainbow (United States)
 March 14 - VeggieTales: Moe and the Big Exit (United States)
 March 22 - Mug Travel (South Korea)
 March 23: 
 TMNT (United States and Hong Kong)
 Meet the Robinsons (United States)
 April 13 - Aqua Teen Hunger Force Colon Movie Film for Theaters (United States)
 April 21: 
 Detective Conan: Jolly Roger in the Deep Azure (Japan)
 Shana of the Burning Eyes (Japan)
 April 24 - Princess of the Sun (France)
 May 10 - Two Times Lotte (Germany)
 May 17 - Papelucho and the Martian (Chile)
 May 18 - Shrek the Third (United States)
 May 25 - Going Nuts (Spain)
 May 30 - Initial D: Battle Stage 2 (Japan)
 June 1 - The Big Fighting between Wukong and God Erlang (China)
 June 5 - Highlander: The Search for Vengeance (Japan, Hong Kong, and United States)
 June 8:
 Surf's Up (United States)
 A Tale of Two Mozzies (Denmark)
 June 27 - Persepolis (France)
 June 29 - Ratatouille (United States)
 July 5 - Noah's Ark (Argentina and Italy)
 July 6 - The Warrior (China)
 July 7 - Genius Party (Japan)
 July 10 - Minushi (Canada)
 July 14 - Pokémon: The Rise of Darkrai (Japan)
 July 17 - Gladiformers - Transforming Gladiators (Brazil)
 July 19 - Isidoro, La Película (Argentina)
 July 21 - Piano no Mori: The Perfect World of Kai (Japan)
 July 27 - The Simpsons Movie (United States)
 July 28 - Summer Days with Coo (Japan)
 July 29 - Mazu (Taiwan)
 July 31 - Bratz Kidz: Sleep-Over Adventure (United States)
 August 4: 
 Care Bears: Oopsy Does It! (United States)
 Naruto Shippuden: the Movie (Japan)
 August 14 - Doctor Strange (United States)
 August 28 - H. P. Lovecraft's The Dunwich Horror and Other Stories (Japan)
 September 1 - Evangelion: 1.0 You Are (Not) Alone (Japan)
 September 4: 
 Disney Princess Enchanted Tales: Follow Your Dreams (United States)
 Chill Out, Scooby-Doo! (United States)
 September 15 - Clannad (Japan)
 September 18: 
 Barbie as the Island Princess (United States and Canada)
 Superman: Doomsday (United States)
 September 20 - The Little King Macius (Poland, Germany, and France)
 September 29 - Sword of the Stranger (Japan)
 October 2 - Elf Bowling the Movie: The Great North Pole Elf Strike (United States)
 October 9:
 Bratz: Super Babyz (United States)
 VeggieTales: The Wonderful Wizard of Ha's (United States)
 October 11 - Nocturna (Spain, France and United Kingdom)
 October 13: 
 Budak Lapok (Malaysia)
 The Chosen One (United States)
 October 14 - Year of the Fish (United States)
 October 16 - Plan Bee (United States)
 October 18 - The Three Robbers (Germany)
 October 19:
 Appleseed Ex Machina (Japan)
 Christmas Is Here Again (United States)
 Tengers (South Africa)
 The Ten Commandments (United States and Canada)
 October 25 - Lissi and the Wild Emperor (Germany)
 October 26 - Bal Ganesh (India)
 October 30 - LeapFrog: A Tad of Christmas Cheer (United States)
 November 1 - Legend of Nahuala (Mexico)
 November 2 - Bee Movie (United States)
 November 8 - Martín Fierro, La Película (Argentina)
 November 9 - Welcome Back Pinocchio (Italy)
 November 10 - Yes! Precure 5: Great Miraculous Adventure in the Mirror Kingdom! (Japan)
 November 16 - Beowulf (United States)
 November 19 - Tom and Jerry: A Nutcracker Tale (United States)
 November 20 - Garfield Gets Real (United States)
 November 21 - Enchanted (United States)
 November 22 - Donkey Xote (Spain)
 November 27: 
 Futurama: Bender's Big Score (United States)
 The Land Before Time XIII: The Wisdom of Friends (United States)
 November 29 - Egon & Dönci (Hungary)
 November 30 - Winx Club: The Secret of the Lost Kingdom (Italy)
 December 5:
 Go West! A Lucky Luke Adventure (France)
 The Life of Buddha (Thailand)
 December 8 - RH+, The Vampire of Seville (Spain)
 December 14 - Quest for a Heart (Finland, Germany, United Kingdom, and Russia)
 December 20 - Cat City 2: The Cat of Satan (Hungary)
 December 21 - Amazon Jack (Denmark, Latvia, and Norway)
 December 22 - Bleach: The DiamondDust Rebellion (Japan)
 December 27 - Pulentos: The Movie (Chile)
 December 28: 
 Ilya and the Robber (Russia)
 Return of Hanuman (India)
 Specific date unknown: 
 Alice in Wonderland: What's the Matter With Hatter? (United States)
 Cosmic Boy (Brazil)
 Friends Forever (India)
 Jungle Book: Rikki-Tikki-Tavi to the Rescue (United States)
 The Prince and the Pauper: Double Trouble (United States)
 Ramses (Italy)
 Ratatoing (Brazil)
 Ségou Fanga (Tunisia)
 The Three Musketeers: Saving The Crown (United States)

Television series debuts

Television series endings

Births

January
 January 31: Tex Hammond, American artist, former actor and son of Grey DeLisle (voice of Lincoln Loud in seasons 3-4 of The Loud House and The Casagrandes, Fangbert in Vampirina, additional voices in Glitch Techs).

February
 February 23: Leah Mei Gold, American actress (voice of Sid Chang in The Loud House and The Casagrandes).

April
 April 20: Terrence Little Gardenhigh, American actor (voice of Ronathan in Madagascar: A Little Wild, Flash Fireson in Firebuds).
 April 26: Presley Williams, American actress (voice of young Sandy Cheeks in The SpongeBob Movie: Sponge on the Run).

May
 May 9: Lily Sanfelippo, American actress (voice of Gwen Stacy / Ghost-Spider in Spidey and His Amazing Friends, Stacy Frick in Turning Red, Axl Ambrose in Firebuds, young Lilith Clawthorne in The Owl House episode "Young Blood, Old Souls").

August
 August 16: Seth Carr, American actor (voice of Calvin in Oni: Thunder God's Tale).
 August 27: Ariana Greenblatt, American actress (voice of young Velma Dinkley in Scoob!, Tabitha Templeton in The Boss Baby franchise).
 August 29: Jaiden Klein, American actress (voice of Felicia Hardy / Black Cat in Spidey and His Amazing Friends).
 August 31: Jason Maybaum, American actor (voice of young Squidward Tentacles in The SpongeBob Movie: Sponge on the Run, young Keys in Big City Greens, Fife in Summer Camp Island, Snefton in Wolfboy and the Everything Factory, Teddy VonTaker in Action Pack).

October
 October 22: Izaac Wang, American actor (voice of Buon in Raya and the Last Dragon, Sam Wing in Gremlins: Secrets of the Mogwai).

November
 November 8: Micah Abbey, American actor (voice of Donatello in Teenage Mutant Ninja Turtles: Mutant Mayhem).

December
 December 4: Scarlett Estevez, American actress (voice of Esme Louise in If You Give a Mouse a Cookie, Izzy in The Grinch).

Deaths

January
 January 4: 
 Helen Hill, American activist, writer, teacher, film director and animator (Scratch and Crow, The Florestine Collection), is murdered at age 36.
 Steve Krantz, American film producer and writer (Spider-Man, Fritz the Cat, The Nine Lives of Fritz the Cat, Heavy Traffic), dies at age 83.
 January 8: Iwao Takamoto, American animator, film director, television producer and character designer (Walt Disney Company, Hanna-Barbera), dies at age 81 from a heart attack.
 January 14: Harvey Cohen, American composer and orchestrator (Walt Disney Animation Studios, Warner Bros. Animation), dies at age 55.
 January 26: Emanuele Luzzati, Italian painter, illustrator, animator and film director (La Gazza Ladra, Pulcinella, Il Flauto Magico, I paladini di Francia), dies at age 85.

February
 February 12: Warren Batchelder, American animator (Warner Bros. Cartoons, DePatie-Freleng, Peanuts specials), dies at age 89.
 February 14: 
 Ryan Larkin, Canadian animator (Walking, Street Musique) dies at age 63 from lung cancer.
 Willy Moese, German comics artist and animator (Zauberlehrling, Blaff und Biene, Rolle und Robby), dies at age 79.
 February 15: Walker Edmiston, American voice actor (voice of Ernie the Keebler Elf from The Keebler Company, Squiddly Diddly and Yakky Doodle in Yogi's Ark Lark, various characters in Down and Dirty Duck, Inferno in The Transformers, Sir Thornberry in Adventures of the Gummi Bears, Whizzer in Spider-Man, Fire Lord Azulon in the Avatar: The Last Airbender episode "Zuko Alone", Marty in the Ben 10 episode "Permanent Retirement"), dies at age 81.

March
 March 3: Osvaldo Cavandoli, Italian cartoonist (creator of La Linea), dies at age 87.
 March 15: Natatcha Estébanez, Puerto Rican-born American television producer (Postcards from Buster), dies from complications from a metastasized sarcoma at age 45.
 March 22: Elbert Tuganov, Estonian animator and film director (Little Peeter's Dream), dies at age 87.
 March 27: Maxwell Becraft, Canadian animator (Warner Bros. Animation, The Super Mario Bros. Super Show!, He-Man and the Masters of the Universe, Bucky O'Hare and the Toad Wars, Attack of the Killer Tomatoes, Duckman, Muppet Babies, Sonic the Hedgehog, X-Men), dies at age 62.

April
 April 11: Roscoe Lee Browne, American actor (voice of Francis in Oliver & Company, Kingpin in Spider-Man, Mr. Arrow in Treasure Planet, the Great Mystic Gnome in the Freakazoid! episode "Lawn Gnomes: Chapter IV – Fun in the Sun"), dies at age 84.
 April 30: Tom Poston, American actor (voice of Capital City Goofball in The Simpsons episode "Dancin' Homer", Ralph and Burly Man in the Aaahh!!! Real Monsters episode "O'Lucky Monster", Roy in the Rugrats episode "Hair!", Mr. Popper in the King of the Hill episode "Now Who's the Dummy?", additional voices in Liberty's Kids), dies from respiratory failure at age 85.

May
 May 6: Reiko Okuyama, Japanese animator (Toei Animation), dies at age 70.
 May 22: Art Stevens, American animator and film director (Walt Disney Company), dies at age 92.
May 25: Charles Nelson Reilly, American actor, comedian, director and drama teacher (host of Uncle Croc's Block, voice of Frank Frankenstone in The Flintstone Comedy Show, Killer in All Dogs Go to Heaven, All Dogs Go to Heaven: The Series and An All Dogs Christmas Carol, Hunch in Rock-a-Doodle, D.O.R.C. in Space Cats, Dutch Spackle in Goof Troop, King Llort in A Troll in Central Park, Mr. Dumpty in Babes in Toyland, Red Parrot Stan in Tom and Jerry: Shiver Me Whiskers, Minos in the Hercules episode "Hercules and the Minotaur", Edmund Haynes in the Rugrats episode "Game Show Didi", the Dirty Bubble in the SpongeBob SquarePants episode "Mermaid Man and Barnacle Boy II"), dies from pneumonia at age 76.

July
 July 4: James Street, American child actor (second voice of Huckleberry Pie in Strawberry Shortcake), dies in a skateboarding accident at age 13.
 July 5: David Hilberman, American animator, film director and producer (Walt Disney Company, co-founder of UPA, Hanna-Barbera), dies at age 95.
 July 9: Charles Lane, American actor (voice of Georges Hautecourt in The Aristocats), dies at age 102.
 July 22: Alexander Tatarsky, Russian film director, animator, and producer (Plasticine Cow, Good Night, Little Ones!, Investigation Held by Kolobki, Turn off the Light!), dies at age 56.

August
 August 11: Roberto Gavioli, Italian animator (Once Upon a Time, The Night the Animals Talked), dies at age 81.
 August 13: Paul Boyd, American-Canadian animator (Ed, Edd n Eddy, 101 Dalmatians: The Series, Dragon Tales, Quack Pack, Aaagh! It's the Mr. Hell Show!, Kenny the Shark, ¡Mucha Lucha!, PB&J Otter, The Angry Beavers, Fetch! with Ruff Ruffman, The Simpsons, Pepper Ann), dies at age 39.

September
 September 5: Jack Valenti, American political advisor, lobbyist and president of the Motion Picture Association (voiced himself in the Freakazoid! episode "The Chip"), dies from a stroke at age 85.
 September 24: Hiroshi Ōsaka, Japanese animator, film director and producer, character designer and illustrator (Bones Animation Studio), dies from cancer at age 44.

October
 October 5: John Rice, American animator (Hanna-Barbera, The Berenstain Bears, Teen Wolf) and overseas supervisor (Hanna-Barbera, Meena, The Mask, Toonsylvania, God, the Devil and Bob, Lilo & Stitch: The Series, Tom and Jerry Tales, The Mighty B!), dies at an unknown age.
 October 12: Noel Coleman, English actor (narrator of Captain Pugwash), dies at age 87.
 October 30: Robert Goulet, American singer and actor (voice of Jaune-Tom in Gay Purr-ee, Asst. Coach Ferret in the My Gym Partner's a Monkey episode "Animal School Musical", himself in The Simpsons episode "$pringfield (or, How I Learned to Stop Worrying and Love Legalized Gambling)", and the Gary the Rat episode "Manrattan", singing voice of Mikey Blumberg in Recess and Wheezy in Toy Story 2), dies from pulmonary fibrosis at age 73.

November
 November 8: Motosuke Takahashi, Japanese film director, animator, character designer and storyboard artist (Tatsunoko Productions, Studio Pierrot), dies at age 66.
 November 25: Roberto Del Giudice, Italian voice actor (dub voice of Arsène Lupin III in Lupin III), dies at age 67.
 November 28: Donyo Donev, Bulgarian cartoonist, caricaturist, animator and comics artist (The Three Fools) (Trimata Glupaci), Chetirmata Glupaci, Umno Selo), dies at age 78.

December
 December 5: Peter Orton, English media entrepreneur and television producer (HiT Entertainment), dies from cancer at age 64.
 December 6: Ken Southworth, English animator (Walt Disney Company, MGM, Walter Lantz, Hanna-Barbera, Filmation, Clokey Productions, Warner Bros. Animation), dies at age 89.
 December 17:
 Jack Zander, American animator and animation producer (MGM, Zander's Animation Parlour), dies at age 99.
 Mel Leven, American composer and lyricist (wrote "Cruella de Vil" for One Hundred and One Dalmatians), dies at age 93.

Specific date unknown
 Juraj Korda, Australian animator (Li'l Elvis and the Truckstoppers, John Callahan's Quads!, Dogstar), dies at age 46.

See also
2007 in anime

References

External links 
Animated works of the year, listed in the IMDb

 
2000s in animation